Afterpay Limited (abbreviated as Afterpay) is an Australian financial technology company best known for its buy now, pay later (BNPL) service.  It operates in Australia, the United Kingdom, Canada, the United States, and New Zealand. Afterpay was founded in 2014 by Nick Molnar and Anthony Eisen.

In June 2017, Afterpay merged with one of its technology suppliers, Touchcorp, to form the Afterpay Touch Group. In November 2019, the company was renamed Afterpay Limited. In August 2021, Afterpay and American payments company Square, Inc. (later renamed Block, Inc. in December 2021) announced they had entered into arrangements for Square to acquire Afterpay for 29 billion (39 billion), which was later completed on January 31, 2022.

History 
Afterpay was founded by Molnar and his then-neighbor, Eisen, in October 2014. On 4 May 2016, the company listed on the Australian Securities Exchange with an 25 million IPO. In January 2018, American venture capital fund Matrix Partners announced its intention to invest 19.4 million in Afterpay to support its entry into the US retail market. Afterpay was launched in the US in mid-May 2018 with retailers such as Anthropologie, Free People, and Urban Outfitters. With reported underlying sales of 4.7 billion in the 11 months to May 2019, in June 2019, Afterpay raised 317.2 million in fresh capital through a share issue, in part to help fund its international growth.

Two months later, the company revealed that it had over two million active users and 6,500 merchants in the US and announced a strategic partnership with Visa Inc. On 21 May 2020, the company announced that its operations had grown to five million active customers in the US.

In August 2018, Afterpay acquired 90% of the equity in Clearpay, a UK based BNPL service, for a total consideration of one million Afterpay shares. In its 2019 financial year update, the company announced that its growth in the UK was faster than that of the US, with more than 200,000 UK customers joining in the first 15 weeks.

During the COVID-19 pandemic, many retailers closed physical stores and potential customers were increasingly hesitant to shop in-person. The Financial Review commented that Afterpay's growth was spurred by "investors [who] are seeking exposure to e-commerce as the coronavirus crisis pushes more shopping online, and continuing government stimulus will keep bad debts low”. In 2020, Afterpay unveiled plans to expand its services to at least four continents, including Asia, to capitalize on the online shopping surge brought by the COVID-19 pandemic. This plan would entail the acquisition of Singapore-based, Indonesia-focused buy-now-pay-later service EmpatKali.

In August 2021, Afterpay and Square, a digital payments company, announced that Afterpay would be acquired by Square. Square will pay 39 billion in stock for the acquisition and the process is expected to be finalised in the first quarter of 2022. It was reported that Molnar and Eisen will lead Afterpay's merchant and consumer businesses inside Square. Shares of Afterpay in Australia closed higher after the news.

In November 2021, Afterpay announced that they would launch BNPL for subscriptions, such as for gym memberships and entertainment subscriptions, to U.S customers.

On January 12, 2022, the Bank of Spain approved Block's takeover bid of Afterpay, marking the final hurdle in the acquisition merger. On January 19, 2022, Afterpay suspended trading of its shares on the ASX. On January 20, 2022, the merged entity trading as Block commenced trading on the ASX under the ticker SQ2. On January 31, 2022, Block completed the acquisition of Afterpay, officially making it a subsidiary.

Business model 
Afterpay is best known for its "pay later" service that allows in-store and online customers to purchase a product immediately and pay with four equal fortnightly repayments. The repayments are interest-free, but if they are not paid every two weeks as required, late fees of (in Australia) $10 per indiscretion are incurred.

The business is paid the full amount within a few days, less a processing fee of 4.19% (as of January 2019). Afterpay bears the risk of default by the customer.  Its income consists of processing fees and late payment fees.

Impact, criticism and regulation 

The rise of BNPL services such as Afterpay has been cited as a cause of decreasing credit card use in Australia. From 2018 to 2019, the number of credit card accounts dropped nearly 5% from 16.7 million to 15.89 million, with 69% of millennials using their credit card less as a result of Afterpay.

In February 2020, Afterpay was reported to have 3.6 million active customers in the US, 3.1 million in Australia and New Zealand, and 600,000 in the UK.

Millennials are Afterpay's main customer demographic, accounting for 75% of all users. Another significant segment of Afterpay's customer base is university students, of which one third have been found to use short-term borrowing.

Afterpay has been criticized as being harmful to consumers. Studies have found that in order to keep up with payments, some users experience financial stress, incurring debt and neglecting essential needs. PRObono Australia said in 2019 that it was "putting vulnerable young people into vicious cycles of debt that follow them long after they stop spending". Despite this negative press, in 2019, it was reported that 95% of payments had not incurred a late fee.

In 2018, Afterpay announced it earned 24.4% of its income from late fees and 75.6% from merchant fees.

Market commentators suggest that while BNPL payment options (such as Afterpay and its competitors) are showing significant upside for investors, such growth may not be sustained unless the company continues to show that it is able to generate larger basket sizes (i.e., extra sales that consumers would not otherwise have made).

In April 2019, legislation was passed to provide the Australian Securities & Investments Commission (ASIC) with "Product Intervention Powers" (PIP). These powers provide ASIC with authority to intervene where it identifies a risk of significant detriment to retail consumers (including those using BNPL services like Afterpay). The company supported the introduction of these powers as a way to provide regulatory oversight and protect consumers.

In June 2019, Afterpay disclosed that it was under probe by AUSTRAC for potential breaches of  the Anti-Money Laundering and Counter-Terrorism Financing Act 2006 (AML/CTF regulations). The company is "in dialogue" with the regulators, and the outcome of the probe has yet to be determined. AUSTRAC, upon identifying several concerns with its compliance, ordered the appointment of an external auditor at Afterpay's expense to examine its compliance with the AML/CTF regulations.

In November 2020, the ASIC released a report on the BNPL industry, highlighting the need for consumer protections via existing and impending regulatory changes, yet did not call for any new regulation.  The Australian Finance Industry Association's Code of Practice, which came into effect on 1 March 2021, is voluntary, so it does not have the teeth of financial regulation. BNPL platforms charge no interest to its customers, and hence are not subject to Australia's Credit Act. However, during June 2022, the Albanese Government announced that it planned to regulate the BNPL sector under the Credit Act.

Notes 
: Guardian Australia reported that Afterpay raised 125 million to list on the ASX; however, 25 million was raised.

References

External links 
 

Australian companies established in 2014
Block, Inc.
Financial services companies established in 2014
Companies based in Melbourne
Software companies of Australia
Australian brands
Australian subsidiaries of foreign companies
Companies listed on the Australian Securities Exchange
Financial software companies
2022 mergers and acquisitions